The 2015 Singapore Super Series was the fourth Super Series tournament of the 2015 BWF Super Series. The tournament took place in Singapore from April 7–12, 2015 with a total purse of $300,000. A qualification occurred to fill four places in all five disciplines of the main draws

Men's singles

Seeds

Top half

Bottom half

Finals

Women's singles

Seeds

Top half

Bottom half

Finals

Men's doubles

Seeds

Top half

Bottom half

Finals

Women's doubles

Seeds

Top half

Bottom half

Finals

Mixed doubles

Seeds

Top half

Bottom half

Finals

References

Singapore
Singapore Open (badminton)
2015 in Singaporean sport